U.S. Route 60 (US 60) is a major U.S. Highway in the American state of Kentucky. In the early days of the U.S. Highway System, US 60 was originally to be numbered as US 62. Following extensive lobbying and complaints filed by Kentucky governor William J. Fields to the American Association of State Highway Officials, the route was re-designated as US 60 before the system was finalized. In Kentucky, US 60 parallels the Ohio River (the northern boundary of the state). US 60 enters Kentucky from Cairo, Illinois, traveling northeast to Louisville, then takes a direct eastward route (near Interstate 64, I-64) to rejoin the Ohio River in downtown Ashland, Kentucky. Both US 60 and US 23 run concurrently from Ashland to Catlettsburg where US 60 turns east and enters Kenova, West Virginia.

Route description
US 60 is concurrent with US 51 and US 62 from the Ohio River bridge to the town of Wickliffe. At Wickliffe, US 60 separates from the other routes and heads generally northeast toward the city of Paducah. Between Wickliffe and Paducah, the towns of Barlow, La Center and Kevil are situated along the route.

In Paducah, US 60 intersects with I-24, and I-24's business loop enters the city concurrent with US 60. In the midtown area, the route once again meets US 62, and also meets US 45. Once out of the city of Paducah, US 60 again veers to the northeast, generally following the Ohio River until reaching Smithland, where the route again turns to the east, passing through the small town of Burna. From Burna, US 60 passes through Salem.

The next city along the route is Marion. At Marion, US 60 turns once more to the north, where it heads toward Sturgis. From Sturgis, the route continues generally northward to Morganfield. In recent years, a bypass of US 60 around the south and east sides of Morganfield has taken a great deal of traffic congestion out of the city.

US 60 passes through Waverly and Corydon before reaching Henderson. At Henderson, the route intersects Kentucky Route 136 (KY 136), KY 425 and US 41A. US 41A is concurrent with US 60 along Green Street in the city of Henderson as it intersects with KY 812 and KY 351. At the US 41 interchange, US 41A ends and US 60 continues alone, bypassing the cities of Owensboro, Lewisport, Hawesville, and Hardinsburg.

In Fort Knox, US 60 connects with US 31W, and they remain together until downtown Louisville. Originally built as a bypass route around downtown Louisville, US 60 Alt. used several existing roads running through Louisville to get between the east and south sides of town without having to travel through the heavily congested downtown or west ends of town. US 60 Alt. runs northeast to southwest from St. Matthews to Shively; including a stretch on one of Frederick Law Olmsted's last remaining parkways, Eastern Parkway. Before its completion and designation as I-264 in 1984, the Henry Watterson Expressway connecting Dixie Highway (US 31W/US 60) and Shelbyville Road (US 60) was signed US 60 Bypass.

After passing Shelbyville, it continues through the state capital of Frankfort, becomes four lanes and then heads more south than east toward Versailles. In Versailles, US 60's eastbound lanes are very briefly the westbound lanes of US 62, which runs more south than west at that point. After turning east and intersecting the Bluegrass Parkway, US 60 is one of the major routes through Lexington. Shortly after entering Fayette County, the road becomes a 6 lane heavily traveled highway, known as Versailles Road. It passed Bluegrass Airport and Keeneland before intersecting with Lexington's beltway, New Circle Road. It is now a 4 lane road going into downtown Lexington. After downtown, it once again becomes a 6 lane road now known as Winchester Road. It passes several suburbs of Lexington before entering northern Hamburg and then intersects I-75 and from there roughly parallels I-64 and goes to Winchester and passes very near the Mountain Parkway but does not intersect with it. It proceeds to Mount Sterling, Morehead, past Carter Caves State Resort Park, on to Grayson and finally to Ashland. US 23 southbound follows US 60 eastbound into Catlettsburg, where they split at 35th Street. US 23 southbound continues straight as a four-lane highway, while US 60 eastbound turns onto 35th Street, passes Oakland Avenue, and enters Kenova, West Virginia via the Billy C. Clark Bridge.

History
When the first finalized proposal for the U.S. Highway System was presented by the Bureau of Public Roads in December 1925, the route between Ozark, Missouri and what would become U.S. Route 52 (US 52) in West Virginia near Ashland, Kentucky was originally proposed as US 62. The US 60 designation was proposed along a different highway from Los Angeles, California to Chicago, Illinois via Tulsa, Oklahoma. On December 8, 1925, a complaint was registered by Kentucky governor William J. Fields over the placement of the US 60 designation, being unhappy no major U.S. Highways ending with the number "0" were planned through his state. Major U.S. Highways ending in "0" were planned to be the main east-west routes of the system. The two closest major east-west routes, US 50 and US 70, were planned to run through states located north and south of Kentucky. Fields therefore proposed the US 60 designation be re-routed through Kentucky.

Fields' opposition to the original numbering plan led to an arranged meeting with the American Association of State Highway Officials (AASHO) Executive Committee in Chicago. Attending was Cyrus Avery, an AASHO committee leader representing the state of Oklahoma and a proponent of the Chicago to Los Angeles route. Avery disagreed with Fields' complaint and stated the US 60 designation should remain on the Chicago Los Angeles route. Following the meeting, the Executive Committee decided to retain the US 60 designation for the Chicago to Los Angeles route, taking the side of Avery. The Committee however, did attempt to rectify Kentucky's complaints by extending the eastern terminus of the proposed US 62 from its endpoint in West Virginia near Ashland to Newport News, Virginia. US 62 would also be extended from Ozark to Springfield, Missouri. Fields was not pleased with the US 62 extension and continued to campaign for US 60 to be routed through Kentucky. Fields later returned to AASHO with support from Kentucky's Congressional delegation and presented his argument to AASHO's chairman Thomas H. MacDonald on January 25, 1926. MacDonald agreed with Fields' argument and AASHO subsequently exchanged the number of the Los Angeles to Chicago route with the Newport News to Springfield route.

Following the change, Avery opposed removing "US 60" from the Los Angeles to Chicago route, stating the state Oklahoma had already undergone extensive preparation for the "US 60" designation, producing official signage and printing maps in anticipation for the new number. Avery was further upset that the decision to re-designate the Chicago to Los Angeles route had been done without his knowledge or consent. Officials from Missouri also heavily protested the change in numbering. AASHO officials rebutted against Avery's complaints citing he had consented to a possible number swap in the earlier Chicago meeting. Nevertheless, AASHO, tried to present a compromise to both Fields and Avery, returning the US 60 designation to the route between Los Angeles and Springfield, but re-designating the Springfield to Chicago route as "US 60N" and the Springfield to Virginia Beach route as "US 60E". Neither side agreed with the compromise and demanded to have their way. Eventually, Avery and his allied proponents agreed to let Kentucky have "US 60" so long as the Chicago to Los Angeles Route became "US 66" instead of "US 62". Fields had no objection to this proposal as it meant his route would now be designated as "US 60". When the finalized U.S. Highway system was approved on November 11, 1926, U.S. Route 60 was officially designated through Kentucky, giving the state a main U.S. Highway ending with the number "0". US 60 was later extended to Los Angeles on June 8, 1931. The route would later be truncated to Brenda, Arizona.

Until 2010, US 60 passed through the city of Owensboro, while US 60 Bypass (Wendell H. Ford Expressway) skirted the city to its south. The city of Owensboro and state of Kentucky requested the decommissioning of US 60 within the city, and the American Association of State Highway and Transportation Officials approved the request, making the expressway the main line of US 60. As of April 2011, signage has been changed, and US 60 now solely follows the expressway around Owensboro.

Especially in the eastern and central part of the state, US 60 has been largely replaced by I-64 for long distance travel, since both routes follow each other through much of this area. However, several cities in this area rely on US 60 to connect them to the Interstate. By contrast, in the western part of the state, US 60 is not paired with an Interstate Highway and serves a much more independent purpose, connecting communities located along and near the Ohio River.

Major intersections

See also

Roads in Louisville, Kentucky

References

Further reading

External links

 Kentucky
60
Transportation in Ballard County, Kentucky
Transportation in McCracken County, Kentucky
Transportation in Livingston County, Kentucky
Transportation in Crittenden County, Kentucky
Transportation in Union County, Kentucky
Transportation in Henderson County, Kentucky
Transportation in Daviess County, Kentucky
Transportation in Hancock County, Kentucky
Transportation in Breckinridge County, Kentucky
Transportation in Meade County, Kentucky
Transportation in Hardin County, Kentucky
Transportation in Jefferson County, Kentucky
0060
Transportation in Shelby County, Kentucky
Transportation in Franklin County, Kentucky
Transportation in Woodford County, Kentucky
Transportation in Lexington, Kentucky
Transportation in Clark County, Kentucky
Transportation in Montgomery County, Kentucky
Transportation in Bath County, Kentucky
Transportation in Rowan County, Kentucky
Transportation in Carter County, Kentucky
Transportation in Boyd County, Kentucky
Paducah micropolitan area
Owensboro metropolitan area
Middletown, Kentucky
Shelbyville, Kentucky
Frankfort, Kentucky micropolitan area
Mount Sterling, Kentucky micropolitan area
Ashland, Kentucky